Baraboo School District is a school district headquartered in Baraboo, Wisconsin.

The district serves Baraboo, West Baraboo, North Freedom, and a portion of Lake Delton.

History
The City of Baraboo incorporated in 1882. When the school district was first established, the district was solely within the City of Baraboo; the district charged tuition for students living in West Baraboo in other surrounding areas. The Mayor of Baraboo appointed members of the school board.

The city had three wards upon its creation, and the initial plan was that one school building would serve one ward. New schools were built to serve those wards.

The board system changed to one where citizens vote for board members in 1938. The district expanded in size in 1961-1962, so areas previously paying tuition no longer had to.

Schools
Secondary:
 Baraboo High School
 Jack Young Middle School
 It is located in far northwest Baraboo, on land donated by the Draper family.
 By the period prior to 1928 Baraboo Junior High occupied one of two buildings on the block of 311 Ash Street, with both sharing a heating system, and the other being Baraboo High School. In 1929 a new high school campus at 124 Second Street, designed by Claude and Starck of Madison, Wisconsin and funded by $225,000, opened; it was under construction since 1928. The previous junior high building of 311 Ash Street was demolished while the former senior high school building at that address became the junior high building. In 1938 an underground passage was built between 124 2nd and 311 Ash. In 1961 a new high school building opened, and the 124 Second Street building became the new junior high school. The former 311 Ash junior high school building was demolished. The current junior high/middle school building opened in 1979, and that year 124 Second Street became the Baraboo Civic Center. The Civic Center building is a part of the Downtown Baraboo Historic District, listed on the National Register of Historic Places on June 8, 2015. In 2015 the school received a new classroom devoted to courses related to mathematics, science, and technology.

Primary:
 Al Behrman Elementary School
 The $320,555 South School opened in 1956. It is now known as Al Behrman Elementary.
 East Elementary School
 The $372,998 school opened in 1954. A new library and media center was built circa June 2015.
 Gordon L. Willson Elementary School
 The construction occurred in the years 1969 and 1970. In 1986 an addition on the north lawn was being built. In 1987 and 1989 the additions were installed, including a 12 classroom wing. In addition, there was an interior renovation.
 North Freedom Elementary School
 It opened in 1902. In 1976 it had the value of $147,000 and was the only elementary school that the district was using that had not been built within 30 years prior.

Kindergarten:
 West Kindergarten Center
 A one story school, previously operating as West Elementary School, it is between Downtown Baraboo and Oschner Park. The West School, built for $261,370, opened 1951, replacing the First Ward School, and the Second Ward School.

Preschools:
Baraboo Early Learning Cooperative (BELC)

Former schools
In 1885 the $8,000 First Ward School opened at the intersection of Summit Street and Sixth Avenue.

The Second Ward School, a Queen Anne style building, was built in 1889. The Madison company Conover & Porter designed it.

On January 9, 1883, the Third Ward School, a six classroom Queen Anne building, opened after having been under construction since 1882. The school was located at Elm Street at Grove Street. The Third Ward had a major population increase due to the 1871 construction of a railroad.

According to the Baraboo Historical Society, in 1950 a fire ruined the First Ward School building. A document posted by the Baraboo Public Library stated that the fire destroyed the Second Ward School Building.

Some former schools were acquired by the district in the 1960s. Lyons, now known as West Baraboo, was served by a wood schoolhouse until a permanent brick one was built in 1901. The former wood building became a storage unit and was relocated to Oschner Park. The brick building was razed in 1981. The $56,444 Pleasant Valley School opened in 1956.

References

Further reading
 Briscoe, J.S. Annual Report and Course of Study of the Public Schools of Baraboo, Wisconsin. Baraboo (Wis.). Board of Education, 1901. Available on Google Books.

External links
 Baraboo School District

School districts in Wisconsin
Education in Sauk County, Wisconsin
Baraboo, Wisconsin